Strangers is a British television crime drama series, principally written and created by Mark Denton 
and Jonny Stockwood, that was first broadcast on ITV on 10 September 2018. Originally titled White Dragon, the series was principally filmed in Hong Kong and is notable for featuring the first English-speaking role for award-winning actor Anthony Wong. 

Aside from Wong, John Simm stars as the principal character, Professor Jonah Mulray, alongside Dervla Kirwan as his wife Megan; Emilia Fox as Sally Porter, the second British Secretary; Katie Leung as Lau Chen, David and Megan's daughter; and Tom Wu as Daniel Tsui, a senior detective working for the Hong Kong police. Prior to the television premiere, the first episode was made available to watch four days early on both the ITV Hub and STV Player as a "Player Première".

Plot
Professor Jonah Mulray's life is turned upside-down when his wife, Megan (Dervla Kirwan), is killed in a car crash in Hong Kong. Although she lived and worked there half her life, Jonah has never been. He lives a small, sheltered life, and his fear of flying has kept him in London. But now he has no choice but to travel to the other side of the world to identify the body of the woman he loved.

Not long after arriving in Hong Kong, Jonah makes a shocking discovery about his wife. Jonah is drawn deeper and deeper into a web of conspiracy as he comes to terms with this utterly alien and unfamiliar environment, battling to uncover the truth about his wife's death.

Cast
 John Simm as Professor Jonah Dougal Mulray
 Anthony Wong as David Chen
 Emilia Fox as Sally Porter
 Katie Leung as Lau Chen
 Anthony Hayes as Michael Cohen
 Tom Wu as Detective Inspector Daniel Tsui
 Dervla Kirwan as Megan Emilia Harris
 Tim McInnerny as Arthur Bach
 Raquel Cassidy as Rachel Hargreaves
 Thomas Chaanhing as Detective Inspector Felix Chong
 Kenneth Tsang as Xiadong Xo
 Christophe Tek as Detective Wilfred Chow
 Jason Wong as Kai Huang
 Ryan McKen as Faraz Reza
 Kae Alexander as Becky
 Andrew Knott as Conrad Davies
 Rosalind Halstead as Emma
 Orion Lee as Allen Ma
 Stuart Ong as Shibao
 Dave Wong as Robin Liu
 Peter Lau as Choi Huang, Kai Huang's Father

Production
Harry and Jack Williams, principally known for mystery drama series The Missing, were executive producers of the series, as well as contributing to the script. Paul Andrew Williams was the sole director for all eight episodes.

Episodes

Home media
The complete series was released on Region 2 DVD on 19 November 2018 via Dazzler Media.

References

External links
 

2018 British television series debuts
2018 British television series endings
2010s British drama television series
2010s British television miniseries
English-language television shows
ITV television dramas
Television series by All3Media
Television shows filmed in Hong Kong